Radio Dreams is a 2016 American film by Iranian-born film director Babak Jalali. Inspired by a group of real life Iranian Metallica fans, calling themselves the Persian Magnetic, and the realities of expatriate life of the Iranian diaspora in the United States. 

The film Radio Dreams won the 2016 Tiger Award at the International Film Festival Rotterdam, and Jalali won the Best Director Award at Andrey Tarkovsky Film Festival in Russia. In 2016 the film was shown at the 32nd Warsaw Film Festival in the "Discoveries" section.

Plot
Hamid Royani is the station manager at Pars-FM Radio, the Bay Area's premiere Persian language radio station. As everyone at Pars-FM looks forward to a continuously delayed jam session by Afghan rock band Kabul Dreams with metal legends Metallica, Royani despairs. As a respected man of the arts in his homeland, he must struggle against the commercial demands of the station's owners; erudite and eloquent in his own tongue, he must face the ups and downs of everyday life in a land where he can hardly speak the language.

Cast
Mohsen Namjoo as Hamid Royani
Lars Ulrich as himself
Boshra Dastournezhad as Maral Afshar
Kabul Dreams (Sulyman Qardash, Siddique Ahmed, Raby Adib) as themselves
Bella Warda as Sherbet
Mohammad Talani as Reza Gerami
Babak Mortazavi as Jamshid
Mahmood Schricker as Morad
 Keyumars Hakim as Sohrab Afshar
 Leila Shahrestani as Leila Shahrestani
 Ali Tahbaz as Yashar
 Mansur Taeed as Dr. Jim Rakhshandeh
 Larry Laverty as TV reporter
 Kyle Kernan as wrestling coach
 Casimir Carothers as little drumming boy
 Fat Dog as guitar salesman
 Litz Plummer as opera singer

Production
, a producer of community documentaries, was looking to produce her first fictional feature and approached Babak Jalali to helm it. A personal friend of Mohsen Namjoo, Moghimi introduced him to Jalali; at the same time Kabul Dreams had just decided to relocate to the United States, and around these cast members the story was written. With a minimal budget of US$300,000, a virtue was made of necessity and the story that developed staged the action within the span of a day within the confines of a radio station. This setting in turn was to play a part in the lighting and camera setups used by cinematographer Noaz Deshe. The design of the film poster was made by design agency, Ceft and Company New York.

Reception
Neil Young of The Hollywood Reporter described the film as, "presenting a nuanced, intelligent and consistently droll take on hot-button subjects of immigration, identity and cultural assimilation..." and that it "stand[s] comparison with the finest radio-themed enterprises of the current century..."

Writing in Variety, critic Catherine Bray called the film a "quietly satisfying gem..." and a "deserving Tiger competition winner at Rotterdam..."

Awards and nominations

See also

White Shadow (film)

References

External links

Radio Dreams at Reel Suspects (distribution company website)

2016 films
Iranian comedy-drama films
Films set in the San Francisco Bay Area
Films about radio
Iranian-American films
American comedy-drama films